Cedynia Landscape Park is a protected area (Landscape Park) in north-western Poland, bordering Germany. It was established on 1 April 1993, by order of the governor (voivode) of the then Szczecin Voivodeship. It also has a buffer zone (otulina) covering .

The Park lies within West Pomeranian Voivodeship, in Gryfino County (Gmina Cedynia, Gmina Chojna, Gmina Mieszkowice and Gmina Moryń). Its buffer zone also includes parts of Gmina Trzcińsko-Zdrój and Gmina Widuchowa). The Park lies on the Polish side of part of the lower stretches of the Oder (Odra) river.

The Park's managing authority is called Zespół Parków Krajobrazowych Doliny Dolnej Odry ("Complex of Landscape Parks of the Lower Odra Valley"). The same authority oversees the Lower Odra Valley Landscape Park, Szczecin Landscape Park and Ujście Warty Landscape Park.

Within the Landscape Park are seven nature reserves.

There are 8 nature reserves in the park:

 „Bielinek”
 „Dąbrowa Krzymowska”
 „Dolina Świergotki”
 „Jeziora Siegniewskie”
 „Olszyna Źródliskowa pod Lubiechowem Dolnym”
 „Olszyny Ostrowskie”
 „Wrzosowiska Cedyńskie im. inż. Wiesława Czyżewskiego”
 „Słoneczne Wzgórza”

External links
Website of Zespół Parków Krajobrazowych Doliny Dolnej Odry
Ibid., detailed information on Cedynia Landscape Park

References 

Cedynia
Parks in West Pomeranian Voivodeship
Gryfino County